Soufouroulaye is a village and seat of the commune of Sio in the Cercle of Mopti in the Mopti Region of southern-central Mali.

The town of Soufouroulaye has both Christians and Muslims. Fulfulde is the main language spoken in Soufouroulaye. Local pronunciations of the villages name are Sofurla:y (Fulfulde) and Sófùrlá (Tomo kan).

References

Populated places in Mopti Region